Cottage Inn Pizza is an American pizza franchise delivery company headquartered in Ann Arbor, Michigan. The first Cottage Inn restaurant opened in 1948. There are over 50 franchised stores in operation in Michigan, Ohio, and  China.

History

The Original Cottage Inn 
In Ann Arbor, Michigan, at 512 East William, the original Cottage Inn restaurant still stands today. In the beginning, it was a coffee business that eventually included pizza. In Ann Arbor, it was the first establishment to serve pizza. They are presently situated at 515 E. Williams St. in Ann Arbor, Michigan, the same building as the Original Cottage Inn.

The building was purchased by the current owner in 1961.

Three modifications were made to the restaurant in 1975, 1980, and 1993. A second story was added to the restaurant to provide services for banquet rooms. Due to its proximity to the University of Michigan, students and tourists frequently dine at the Original Cottage Inn. Over the years, the restaurant has built up a solid reputation among the Ann Arbor neighborhood. They take part in annual community service projects including Thanksgiving dinners for the needy.

Early in 2014, Cottage Inn revealed a proposal to use a franchising business model to grow nationally. With its website for franchising, the company is now taking applications from prospective franchisees.

Cottage Inn Carryout 
By 1978, Cottage Inn established Cottage Inn Carryout & Delivery Inc. to devote to delivery services. The first Cottage Inn store under this new company was founded at Packard and Hill streets in Ann Arbor. In June 1986, the first franchise opened in Ypsilanti. In 2003, the new corporate headquarters and distribution center opened in Ann Arbor. In 2017, Cottage Inn opened a franchise location in China.

Sponsorships 
In 2012, Cottage Inn partnered with the Michigan International Speedway to become the official pizza vendor on NASCAR weekends. Although the original plan was for Cottage Inn to provide 24-hour delivery service to customers in the campsites, logistical and staffing issues required the company to scale back its services. Cottage Inn also serves as a pizza vendor for other events held at the Michigan International Speedway, including the Faster Horses Festival.

References 

Restaurants established in 1948
Companies based in Ann Arbor, Michigan
Companies based in Metro Detroit
Fast-food chains of the United States
Pizza chains of the United States
Fast-food franchises
Fast casual restaurants
Regional restaurant chains in the United States
Pizza franchises
1948 establishments in Michigan